Vadim Levental (born 25 October 1981) is a Russian writer.

Biography

Vadim Levental  was born in Saint Petersburg. Currently he is working as an editor in "Limbus Press" publishing house and executive secretary of National Bestseller literary award. In 2011 he authored the idea of "Literary Matrix" collection of short stories mentioned by Neva magazine as "perhaps the most successful literary projects of the last few decades". Levental's debut novel "Masha Regina" was nominated for Russian Booker Prize and shortlisted by the Big Book award jury. According to the Guardian it is "a postmodern bildungsroman... filled with allusions to Russian literature and German philosophy". Some critics consider Levental as one of the most prominent young Russian writers and even "the unique hope of Russian novella" referring to his second book, a short story collection entitled "House of Fears". English translation of "Masha Regina" was published in UK by Oneworld Publications in 2016. In August 2016 the novel represented Russia at Edinburgh International Book Festival.

Quotes

References

1981 births
Living people
Writers from Saint Petersburg